Events from the year 1765 in Denmark.

Incumbents
 Monarch – Frederick V
 Prime minister –  Count Johann Hartwig Ernst von Bernstorff

Events

Births
 10 June – Cladius Detlev Fritzsch, flower painter (died 1841)
 15 August – Christian Horneman, miniature  painter (died 1844)
 3 September – Johan Martin Quist, architect (died 1818)
 3 November – Andreas Hallander, architect and master builder (died 1828)

Deaths
 18 March – Jens Kraft, mathematician (born 1720).

References

 
1760s in Denmark
Denmark
Years of the 18th century in Denmark